Epidendrum martianum  is a rupicolous  species of orchid of the genus Epidendrum. Reichenbach reported that this orchid with paniculate inflorescences grows on the plains near Villa Rica, Minas Gerais, Brazil.

References 

martianum
Endemic orchids of Brazil
Orchids of Minas Gerais